The 2008 Houston Cougars football team, also known as the Houston Cougars, Houston, or UH, represented the University of Houston in the 2008 NCAA Division I FBS football season.  It was the 63rd year of season play for Houston.  The team was coached by first-year head football coach, Kevin Sumlin whose previous position was as co-offensive coordinator for the Oklahoma Sooners.  He replaced Art Briles.  The team played its home games at Robertson Stadium, a 32,000-person capacity stadium on-campus in Houston.  Competing against the Air Force Falcons in the 2008 Armed Forces Bowl, the Cougars won their first bowl game since 1980, and broke the longest current bowl game losing streak in Division I FBS football at that time.  In addition, Houston defeated two nationally ranked opponents, which the Cougars hadn't achieved since their 1984 season.

Previous season
In the 2007 season, the Cougars earned an 8-5 (.615) overall season record and a 6-2 (.750) conference record in C-USA.  The 2007 season would be the last for head coach Art Briles with the Cougars.  Two days after Houston was invited to the 2007 Texas Bowl, Briles immediately departed for the Baylor Bears head coach position in Waco, Texas.  Cornerbacks coach, Chris Thurmond was soon appointed interim head coach, and led the Cougars to the Texas Bowl against the TCU Horned Frogs. The Cougars lost to the Horned Frogs 20-13.

In December 2007, the University of Houston hired Kevin Sumlin, a co-offensive coordinator for the Oklahoma Sooners as the Houston Cougars head coach.

Preseason

Recruiting
Twenty players were recruited for the 2008 season.  Several higher-ranking recruits were lost when Art Briles left, as they followed the coach to Baylor.  Due to Houston's head coach change, Sumlin's ability to recruit before National Signing Day was shorter than usual, as he was finishing his duties with the Oklahoma Sooners.  In early April, it was announced that the Cougars had two other junior college commitments.  Kyle Thomas and Nick Thurston, both from California, came from the City College of San Francisco.  Two other junior college (JUCO) commitments, Clint Leal and Kierrie Johnson, were recruited from Blinn College.  Thomas is expected to join the roster in the Spring, as he still had some coursework to finish in California.

Coaching staff and changes

During the off-season, the Cougars went through a large amount of notable coaching staff changes.  Former co-offensive coordinator for the Oklahoma Sooners, Kevin Sumlin replaced Art Briles as head coach.  Sumlin became the first African-American head coach in Cougar history, and the eighth in the NCAA's Football Bowl Subdivision.  In his final year with the Sooners, his offense was one of the best in the country, averaging 44 points per game.

Dana Holgorsen came to Houston from the Texas Tech Red Raiders, where he spent eight years as offensive coordinator and quarterbacks coach.  He serves the Cougars in the same capacity.

John Skladany replaced Alan Weddell as defensive coordinator.  Skladany came from the UCF Knights, a fellow C-USA team.  Prior to coaching for UCF, Skladany spent ten years with the Iowa State Cyclones.  Sumlin and Skladany followed through with plans to change the Cougars defensive strategy from a 3-4 defense to a 4-3 one.

Leon Burtnett came from the Washington State Cougars as linebackers coach.  New defensive line coach, Jim Jeffcoat spent his last four seasons as defensive ends coach for the NFL's Dallas Cowboys.  Another new addition to the staff with NFL coaching experience was special teams coordinator and tight ends coach Tony Levine, who spent his previous two seasons with the Carolina Panthers.

Staff

Spring practices
From March 8 to April 12, 2008, the Cougars held Spring practices.  In addition to the fourteen practices held throughout this period, the Cougars held two scrimmages, and concluded with the annual "Red-White Game".  The Red-White Game, a home exhibition game between the offensive and defensive players of the Cougars, was a part of festivities held for the University of Houston's "Cougar Fest".  A skydive by the U.S. Army Golden Knights to present the game ball was planned, but was canceled due to high winds.

Schedule

Games notes

Southern

The 2008 game marked the first meeting between the Houston Cougars and the Southern Jaguars.  The team plays in the Southwestern Athletic Conference (SWAC) as a member of the Division I Football Championship Subdivision.  The Grambling Tigers, the Jaguars' main rival, fell to the Cougars as part of their 2006 season schedule 42-22.  In 2007, the Cougars finished their regular season by defeating another SWAC opponent, crosstown Texas Southern Tigers.

Oklahoma State

This marked the nineteenth game between the Cougars and the Oklahoma State Cowboys who were a member of the Big 12 Conference.  Playing against each other since 1951, the Cougars held a 9-8-1 all-time record against the Cowboys, and the last meeting between the two teams was during the 2006 season.  During that meeting, the Cowboys fell to the Cougars 34-25.  The Cougars traveled to Stillwater for the first time since 1986 to compete.  Despite leading the Cowboys during the first half of the game, the Cougars eventually lost 56-37.  The Cowboys went on to be consistently ranked this season as one of the top 25 teams in the nation.

Air Force

Another first meeting on the Cougars' schedule was with the Air Force Falcons.  A member of the Mountain West Conference, the Falcons played football since 1955.  The previous season, the Falcons finished with a 9-4 record, while losing to the California Golden Bears in the 2007 Armed Forces Bowl.  The game was scheduled to be televised on the CBS College Sports Network as the first of the four nationally televised games for the Cougars season, but was canceled.  The game was originally scheduled to be played at Robertson Stadium in Houston, but due to Hurricane Ike, the game was played at SMU's Ford Stadium.  The Cougars fell to the Falcons 31-28.

Colorado State

With a 3-0 all-time record against the Colorado State Rams, the Cougars faced them for the fourth time on the road at Hughes Stadium.  The most recent meeting between the teams had been the season before, where the Rams lost to the Cougars 38-27 in Houston.  Steve Fairchild, a former player for the Rams, and the former offensive coordinator and under previous head coach Sonny Lubick, had taken over as head coach during this season. With a third consecutive loss, the Cougars fell to the Rams 28-25.

East Carolina

This game was the ninth meeting between the Cougars and fellow Conference USA team, the East Carolina Pirates.  Last season, after defeating the Cougars 37-35, the Pirates went on to finish with an 8-5 record including a win against #24 Boise State in the 2007 Hawaii Bowl.  The Pirates led the series between the Cougars 8-5.  The game was broadcast on the CBS College Sports Network, and was played at East Carolina's Dowdy–Ficklen Stadium.  After beating the #17 Virginia Tech Hokies during their 2008 season opener, the Pirates gained national attention.  This continued in their next week of play, as they defeated the #8 West Virginia Mountaineers 24-3, and became ranked by the AP Poll as #14.  Despite an upset by the North Carolina State Wolfpack the week before, the Pirates were ranked at #23 by the AP Poll when the Cougars arrived in Greenville.  Despite predictions that ECU would win the game, the Cougars managed an upset with a large margin of victory.  This was the Cougars' first win over a ranked team since 1996, and the first against a ranked team in a road game since 1984.

UAB

The third home game was the seventh meeting between the Cougars and the UAB Blazers.  With the most recent game between the two teams being last season, the Blazers led the series 4-2. However, the team was defeated by the Cougars, and finished their 2007 season with a 2-10 record, the worst in the school's history.  This followed the departure of Watson Brown to the Tennessee Tech Golden Eagles, and the appointment of former Georgia Bulldogs and Houston Cougars assistant Neil Callaway as head coach.  The game was televised by the CBS College Sports Network.

SMU

Former Southwest Conference and current Conference USA members, the SMU Mustangs faced the Cougars in their twenty-fourth meeting.  The first game between the two teams took place during the 1975 season when Houston joined the Southwest Conference, and the teams have regularly played each other since.  The Cougars led the series 13-9-1, including a 38-28 win against the Mustangs last season.  This season, June Jones, former Hawaii Warriors head coach took the same position at SMU.  At Hawaii, Jones had gained national attention after the Warriors went undefeated, and were invited to the 2008 Sugar Bowl.  After the win, the Cougars moved up in the Conference USA standings to tie for first with an undefeated Tulsa in their division.

Marshall

The Marshall Thundering Herd played the Cougars for the second time in history during this season.  Their last game against each other was played during the 2007 season, where the Thundering Herd was defeated 35-28 in Houston at Robertson Stadium.  This time, Marshall played Houston at home, and won.  This marked the first loss for the Cougars in conference play, and dropped them down in conference standings from 1st to 3rd (after Tulsa and Rice). ESPN broadcast the game. Houston wide receiver Patrick Edwards suffered a gruesome broken leg when he collided with an equipment cart at the back of the end zone, though he would return the next season in a starting role.

Tulane

In another conference game, the Tulane Green Wave traveled to Houston to play the Cougars for the fourteenth time.  Playing their first game together in 1968, the Cougars led the series 9-4.  The teams had competed against each other each consecutive season since 2002, although Tulane hadn't achieved a win against Houston since that same year.  Tulane's head coach Bob Toledo returned for his second year with the Green Wave.  Although not originally scheduled, the game was televised on CBS College Sports, presumably because Houston's TV appearance against Air Force earlier in the season was canceled.  This marked Houston's homecoming game, and was one of the largest attendances for the regular season at Robertson Stadium.

Tulsa

The Tulsa Golden Hurricane and Houston Cougars faced-off for their thirty-third all-time meeting.  Playing together since 1950, Houston had a 17-16 advantage over the Golden Hurricane.  In their 2007 season meeting, new coach Todd Graham led the Golden Hurricane to a 56-7 win over the Cougars.  It was the Cougars' largest margin of defeat for the season.  Tulsa went on to a 10-4 record in the previous season including a 63-7 GMAC Bowl game win against the Bowling Green Falcons.  The team held the record for scoring the largest margin in bowl game history.  The win was considered an upset by the nation, as Tulsa was ranked as #24 in the Coaches' Poll and #25 in the AP Poll.  This marked the second time that the Cougars had beaten a nationally ranked opponent in the season (the other being East Carolina); something Houston hadn't done since its 1984 season under College Football Hall of Fame coach Bill Yeoman.

After the win, the Cougars were again ranked as first in conference play as Tulsa (5-1) had beaten Rice (5-1), and Houston (5-1) had beaten Tulsa.  This made Houston's other two regular season games on the schedule much more significant because if they won both games from this point, they would be allowed to compete in and host the Conference USA Football Championship.

UTEP

Although meeting for the first time during the Cougars' inaugural season in 1946, the UTEP Miners had only met with the Cougars five times in history.  As Conference USA foes, the Cougars held a 2-3 all-time record against the Miners, whereas both wins came consecutively during the 2006 and 2007 meetings of the teams.  Mike Price returned as the Miners' head coach this season.  After a close game, where Houston lagged behind, the Cougars made a fourth quarter comeback to win the game.

Rice

In the 2008 Bayou Bucket Classic, the Cougars will meet with Rice at Rice Stadium as part of the Houston-Rice rivalry.  It will be the 33rd meeting between the two teams, where Houston leads the series 24-9 and have won the last three meetings.  During this season, the outcome of the game will have significant influence for the Conference USA West Division title.  While Houston remains first in the division, a loss to Rice, and a win for Tulsa (9-2) against Marshall (4-7) would mean Tulsa, not Houston would be headed to compete against the East Division champion East Carolina in the Conference USA Football Championship.  If Rice wins its game against the Cougars, and Marshall wins its game against the Golden Hurricane, then Rice would be the West Division champion.  The game was picked up by CBS College Sports after Houston's 70-30 blowout victory against Tulsa.

Armed Forces Bowl

With seven regular season wins, the Cougars secured bowl eligibility.  On December 7, 2008, the Houston Cougars announced that they had been selected to play in the 2008 Armed Forces Bowl game against Air Force in Fort Worth, Texas.  This marked the Cougars' fourth consecutive bowl game invitation, and the fifth in six years.  The game was a rematch, as the Falcons and the Cougars faced off earlier during the regular season, where the Cougars were defeated.  This was the second time in history the Cougars had played a bowl game in Fort Worth; in 2005 the team appeared in the Fort Worth Bowl.

The Cougars defeated the Falcons to win their first bowl game since 1980, and broke the longest current bowl game losing streak in Division I FBS football at that time.  The score was 34-28.  The game was televised on ESPN.

References

External links

Houston
Houston Cougars football seasons
Armed Forces Bowl champion seasons
Houston Cougars football